Victor Neumann is a Romanian historian, political analyst, and professor at the West University in Timișoara. He is a well-known specialist in the recent cultural and intellectual histories of Eastern and Central Europe (focusing his research on interculturality and multiculturality). Much of his work deals with Conceptual History, history of political thought and theory of history. As of October 2013, he is Director of the Timișoara Art Museum.

Biography
Born in Lugoj, Victor Neumann graduated from the University of Cluj-Napoca in 1976, and earned his PhD in History from the University of Bucharest in 1992. He was a visiting professor at the Université d'Angers (1999), Emory University in Atlanta, and Georgia State University in Athens, Georgia (1999), the National Foreign Affairs Training Center from Washington, D.C. (2001), and the University of Vienna (2003–2004). He received NATO Scholarship (1995-1997) and he was Fulbright Senior Scholar (September 2000 - September 2001) affiliated with The Catholic University of America and with the Center for Advanced Holocaust Studies within the Holocaust Memorial Museum, Washington, D.C.

Neumann was also head of research at the École Pratique des Hautes Études in Paris, and a lecturer at several higher learning institutions (the Woodrow Wilson International Center for Scholars, Columbia University, the London School of Slavonic and East European Studies, and the University of Udine).

Works

As author
The Temptation of Homo Europaeus, East European Monographs, Boulder, Colorado, 1993 (Tentația lui Homo Europaeus. Geneza spiritului modern în Europa Centrală și de Sud-Est, 1st edition, Stiințifica Publishing House, Bucharest, 1991; second edition, All Publishing House, Bucharest, 1997; 3rd edition, Polirom Publishing House, Iassy, 2006)
Istoria evreilor din România. Studii documentare și teoretice, Amarcord Publishing House, Timișoara, 1996
Identități multiple în Europa regiunilor. Interculturalitatea Banatului, Hestia Publishing House, Timișoara, 1997
The End of a History: The Jews of Banat from the Beginning to Nowadays, translated by Simona Neumann, The University of Bucharest Publishing House, Bucharest, 2006 (Istoria evreilor din Banat. O mărturie a multi- și interculturalității Europei oriental-centrale, Atlas-Du Style Publishing House, Bucharest, 1999)
Ideologie și fantasmagorie. Perspective comparative asupra istoriei gîndirii politice în Europa Est-Centrală, Polirom Publishing House, Iassy, 2001
Between Words and Reality. Studies on the Politics of Recognition and Changes of Regime in Contemporary Romania, translated by Simona Neumann, Council for Research of Values and Philosophy, The Catholic University of America Press, Washington, D.C., 2001 
Neam, Popor sau Națiune? Despre Identitățile Politice Europene, 1st edition, Curtea Veche Publishing House, Bucharest, 2003; second edition, Curtea Veche Publishing House, Bucharest, 2005 
Conceptually Mystified: East-Central Europe Torn Between Ethnicism and Recognition of Multiple Identities, translated by Mihai Luca, Enciclopedică Publishing House, Bucharest, 2004
Essays on Romanian Intellectual History, translated by Simona Neumann, West University of Timișoara Publishing House, Timișoara, 2008. The second edition Center for Advanced Studies in History Timișoara and Institutul European Publishing House, Iassy, 2013
Sinntausch/Sinntauschungen. Nationalismus und Ethnische Vielfalt in Mitteleuropa, translated by Patrick Lavrits, Dresden Universitaet Verlag (TUD), 2009
Iskusenia Homo Europaeusa, translation by Milisav Firulovič, Pešič I Sinovi, Beograd, 2011
Interculturalitatea Banatului, Art Press – Institutul European Publishing House, Timișoara – Iassy, 2012
Die Interkulturalitaet des Banats, Frank und Timme Verlag, Berlin, 2015
Conceptualizarea istoriei și limitele paradigmei naționale, RAO, București, 2015

Edited and coordinated by
Identitate și Cultură. Studii privind istoria Banatului, Romanian Academy of Sciences Publishing House, Bucharest, 2009
Istoria Romaniai prin concepte. Perspective alternative asupra limbajelor social-politice (together with Armin Heinen), Polirom Publishing House, Iassy, 2010
Key concepts of Romanian history: alternative approaches to socio-political languages (together with Armin Heinen), translated by Dana Mihailescu, Central European University Press, Budapest-New York, 2013
Modernity in Central and Southeastern Europe. Ideas, Concepts, Discourses Edited by/Coordinator and Coauthor Victor Neumann and Armin Heinen, RAO Publisher, Bucharest, 2018
The Banat of Timișoara. A European Melting Pot Edited by Victor Neumann, Scala Arts&Heritage Publishers, London, 2019

Translations
Reinhart Koselleck, Conceptul de istorie, Introduction by Victor Neumann, translated into Romanian by ... together with Patrick Lavrits, Al.I. Cuza University Publishing House, Iassy, 2005

In collaboration
Kenneth Cushner, International Perspectives on Intercultural Education, Lawrence Erlbaum Associates, Mahwah, New Jersey, 1998
Dario Castiglione, Iain Hampsher-Monk, The History of Political Thought in National Context, Cambridge University Press, Cambridge, 2001

Selected articles and book chapters
"Peculiarities of the Translation and Adaptation of the Concept of Nation in East-Central Europe. The Hungarian and Romanian Cases in the Nineteenth Century" in Contributions to the History of Concepts (Berghahn Publishers, New York), vol. 7, N. 1, Summer 2012, p. 72-101. 
"Reinhart Koselleck şi Şcoala de Istorie Conceptuală de la Timișoara", [Reinhart Koselleck and the Doctoral School of Conceptual History from Timișoara] in Timpul, N. 4/2012, p. 12-13.
"The Concept of Totalitarianism in the Romanian Social-Political Languages" in Divinatio. Studia Culturologica Series, N. 31, Sofia, 2010, p. 145-161. 
"Timișoara: A multi- and intercultural city" in Transylvanian Review, vol. 17, N. 3, Sept. 2008, p. 29-37.
Researching the Nation: The Romanian File. Studies and Selected Bibliography on Romanian Nationalism, Edited by Sorin Mitu, International Book Access, Cluj, 2008, 307p. + 165p. 
"Istoria conceptuală şi deconstrucţia limbajelor social-politice. O contribuţie la înnoirea metodologică a istoriografiei române", [Conceptual History and the Deconstruction of Social-Political Languages. A Contribution to the Methodological Renewing of Romanian History] in Memoriile Secţiei de Ştiinţe Istorice şi Arheologie, Series IV, Tome XXXII, 2007,  p. 179-191. 
"Multiculturality and Interculturality: The Case of Timișoara" in Hungarian Studies, vol. 21, N. 1, June 2007, p. 3-18.
"Approche comparative de l’histoire et de la theorie multiculturelle" in Revue Roumaine d’Histoire, Romanian Academy Publishing, N. 1-4, 2007, p. 279-303.
"Conceptual confusions concerning the Romanian identity: Neam and Popor as expressions of ethno-nationalism" in Radio Free Europe/Radio Liberty – East European Perspectives, I, vol. 6, nr. 22, December 17, 2004; II, vol. 7, nr. 1, January 11, 2005; III, vol. 7, N. 2, March 9, 2005. 
"Vergleichende Betrachtungen über die Multikulturelle Philosophie", in Forschungen zur Volks-und Landeskunde, Institutul de Studii Socio-Umane din Sibiu al Academiei Române, N. 48, 2005, Bucharest-Sibiu, p. 7-33.   
"Umbruch im östlichen Europa. Die nationale Wende und das kollektive Gedächtnis", Andrei Corbea-Hoisie/Rudolf Jaworski/Monika Sommer (editors), Innsbruck: Studien Verlag, 2004, the study "Alternative Romanian Textbooks as Sites of Memory", p. 137-149.  
"Romanian-Hungarian Relations and the French-German Reconciliation", Smaranda Enache and Salat Levente (editors), Cluj: Centrul de Resurse pentru Diversitate Etno-Culturală, 2004, the study "Relaţiile româno-maghiare într-un moment de răscruce" [The Romanian-Hungarian Relations at a Turning Point], p. 307-317. 
"Permanences et ruptures dans l’ histoire des Juifs de Roumanie", Carol Iancu (editor), Montpellier: Université Paul Valery, 2004, the study Les Juifs du Banat à la fin du XIXe siècle et au debut du XX-e siècle [The Jews from Banat at the end of the 19th Century and at the Beginning of the 20th Century], p. 127-139. 
"Vertreibungen europäisch erinnern? Historische Erfahrungen – Vergangenheitspolitik – Zukunftskonzepzionen", Wiesbaden: Harrassowitz Verlag, 2003, the study "Erzwungene Auswanderungen. Der Fall der Deutschen aus Rumänien. Der Fall der Magyaren aus Rumänien" [Forced Emigrations. The Case of the Germans from Romania. The Case of the Hungarians from Romania], p. 102-112. 
"Temps historique et temporalité". Autour de Reinhart Koselleck (Die historische Zeit und die Zeitlichkeit. Um Reinhart Koselleck herum), Yvailo Znepolski (editor), Paris: Maison des Sciences de l’Homme, 2003, the study "Le temps historique: une perspective comparative entre Braudel et Koselleck" [The Historical Time: a Comparative Perspective between Braudel and Koselleck], p. 444-460. 
"Civic education and human rights through an intercultural perspective: the Romanian case", NATO Research Fellowships Programme, 1995 https://www.nato.int/acad/fellow/95-97/f95-97.htm
"Majority-Minorities Relationships in Historical and Political Perspective. The Transylvanian Case of Romania", Papeles del Este, 2002, issue 3, Universidad Complutense Madrid http://webs.ucm.es/BUCM/cee/papeles/03/06.PDF  
"Federalism and Nationalism in Austro-Hungarian Monarchy: The Aurel C. Popovici’s Theory" in East European Politics and Societies, California University Press, N. 16, 2002, p. 864-897.
"Conceptualizing Modernity in Multi- and Intercultural Spaces. The Case of Central and Eastern Europe", în vol. Conceptual History in the European Space, edited by Willibald Steinmetz, Michael Freeden, Javier Fernandez Sebastian, Berghahn Publishers, New York-Oxford, 2017, pp. 236–263.

Notes

References
The Romanian Jewish community: Incursion in the life and history of the Jew Community in Timișoara. Important personalities [sic]
 Biography at Editura Curtea Veche
 Simona Chitan, "Victor Neumann, evreii şi naţionalismul", in Evenimentul Zilei, March 19, 2006
Review of Victor Neumann, ed., The Banat of Timişoara: A European Melting Pot (London: Scala Arts & Heritage Publishers, 2019), xvi+495pp. - Centre for Analysis of the Radical Right

External links
Andrei Oișteanu, The History of the Jews of Banat. Chronicle of a Forecasted Book" at the University of Bucharest site

Living people
People from Lugoj
Romanian essayists
20th-century Romanian historians
Romanian political scientists
Romanian Jews
Babeș-Bolyai University alumni
University of Bucharest alumni
Catholic University of America people
Year of birth missing (living people)
21st-century Romanian historians